Ethel is an English name, usually used as a feminine given name, also a surname. 

Ethel or ETHEL may also refer to:

Places

United States
 Ethel, Arkansas, an unincorporated community
 Ethel, Indiana, an unincorporated community
 Ethel, Mississippi, a town
 Ethel, Missouri, a city
 Ethel, Oklahoma, an unincorporated community
 Ethel, Virginia, an unincorporated community
 Ethel, Lewis County, Washington, an unincorporated community
 Ethel, West Virginia, an unincorporated community

Canada
 Ethel, Ontario, Canada, a hamlet

Music
 Ethel (string quartet)
 Ethel (XM), an XM satellite radio channel

Other uses
 Agnes Ethel (1846–1903), American Broadway actress
 Tropical Storm Ethel, various tropical cyclones
 2032 Ethel, an asteroid
 Anglo-Saxon œ-rune, see  Odal (rune)
 Œ, a ligature of the letters o and e, named after the rune
 ETHEL, acronym for Electric Train Heat Ex Locomotive 
 Ethel Apartment House, Springfield, Massachusetts, on the National Register of Historic Places
 Ethel (film), a 2012 documentary
 Ethel, a barque which ran aground on Ethel Beach, Yorke Peninsula, South Australia, in 1904
 Ethel (1899 ship), a steam-powered boat, one of the boats of the Mackenzie River watershed in northern Canada
 Ethel, a hill in England's Peak District

See also
 Ethel the Frog (band), a British heavy metal band from the late 1970s
 Ethyl (disambiguation)